Moonnupookkal is a 1971 Indian Malayalam film, directed by P. Bhaskaran. The film stars Prem Nazir, Sathyan, Madhu and Sheela in the lead roles. The film had musical score by Pukazhenthi.

Cast

Prem Nazir
Sathyan
Madhu
Sheela
Jayabharathi
Sankaradi
Sreelatha Namboothiri
Ambika
Chandrakala
Veeran
Vincent

Soundtrack
The music was composed by Pukazhenthi and the lyrics were written by P. Bhaskaran.

References

External links
 

1971 films
1970s Malayalam-language films
Films directed by P. Bhaskaran
Films scored by Pukazhenthi